Brendan Perlini (born April 27, 1996) is an English-born Canadian professional ice hockey left winger currently playing for the Chicago Wolves of the American Hockey League (AHL). He most recently played for the Bakersfield Condors of the American Hockey League (AHL) while under contract to the Edmonton Oilers of the National Hockey League (NHL).

Perlini was selected by the Arizona Coyotes in the first round (12th overall) of the 2014 NHL Entry Draft. Born in the United Kingdom, where his father, Fred Perlini, played ice hockey, Perlini grew up there before moving to Canada with his family in 2007. He spent four seasons in the major junior Ontario Hockey League (OHL), and made his NHL debut with the Coyotes in 2016. He's also played for the Chicago Blackhawks and Detroit Red Wings.

Internationally, Perlini played for the Canadian national junior team, and won a bronze medal at the 2014 World Under-18 Championship.

Playing career
Perlini was drafted by the Barrie Colts 16th overall in the 2012 OHL Priority Selection, and began the 2012–13 OHL season with the Colts. After 32 games, in which he recorded one goal and one assist, Perlini was traded to the Niagara IceDogs. During the 2013–14 season, he was recognized for his outstanding play when he was chosen to compete in the 2014 CHL Top Prospects Game.

He was drafted by the Arizona Coyotes, 12th overall in the 2014 NHL Entry Draft. On July 19, 2014, he was signed to a three-year NHL entry level contract by the Coyotes.

Perlini began the 2016–17 season with the Tucson Roadrunners, the Coyotes' American Hockey League (AHL) affiliate. After 16 games with the Roadrunners, he was recalled to the Coyotes. At the time, Perlini was tied for the AHL goal scoring lead, with 11, and was the AHL Rookie of the Month for November. He made his NHL debut on December 5, 2016, against the Columbus Blue Jackets. His first goal came on December 10, against Pekka Rinne of the Nashville Predators.

During the 2018–19 season, on November 25, 2018, Perlini and Dylan Strome were traded to the Chicago Blackhawks in exchange for Nick Schmaltz. He finished the season with 21 points in 68 games.

On September 6, 2019, the Blackhawks re-signed Perlini to a one-year, $874,125 contract extension. Perlini began the 2019–20 season as a healthy scratch for the Blackhawks. After appearing in just one of Chicago's opening 10 games, Perlini requested to be traded on October 25. He was traded to the Detroit Red Wings in exchange for Alec Regula on October 28.

On January 23, 2021, Perlini joined HC Ambrì-Piotta of the Swiss National League (NL) as a replacement for injured Julius Nättinen for the remainder of the 2020–21 season. In 21 games, Perlini rediscovered his scoring touch, registering 9 goals and 16 points.

As a free agent in the following off-season, Perlini returned to North America in signing a one-year, two-way contract with the Edmonton Oilers on August 7, 2021.

Personal life
Perlini was born in the United Kingdom, while his father, Fred Perlini, was playing ice hockey. His father, who was drafted by the Toronto Maple Leafs in the 1980 NHL Entry Draft and played eight games for them, spent the majority of his career in the AHL before continuing in the United Kingdom. After he retired from playing in 1997, Fred took up a coaching position with the Guildford Flames, and returned to Canada with his family in 2007, moving to Sault Ste. Marie, Ontario. His older brother, Brett Perlini, was selected in the seventh round of the 2010 NHL Entry Draft by the Anaheim Ducks and played in the ECHL.

Career statistics

Regular season and playoffs

International

See also
List of National Hockey League players born in the United Kingdom

References

External links

1996 births
Living people
Arizona Coyotes draft picks
Arizona Coyotes players
Bakersfield Condors players
Barrie Colts players
Canadian ice hockey left wingers
Chicago Blackhawks players
Chicago Wolves players
Detroit Red Wings players
Edmonton Oilers players
HC Ambrì-Piotta players
Ice hockey people from Ontario
National Hockey League first-round draft picks
Niagara IceDogs players
Portland Pirates players
Sportspeople from Guildford
Sportspeople from Sault Ste. Marie, Ontario
Tucson Roadrunners players
English ice hockey left wingers
Canadian expatriate ice hockey players in the United States
Canadian expatriate ice hockey players in Switzerland
English expatriate sportspeople in Switzerland
English expatriate sportspeople in the United States
British expatriate ice hockey people